Blackwood is a national park in the Charters Towers Region, Queensland, Australia.

Geography 
The park is west of Mount Coolon in North Queensland, 924 km northwest of Brisbane.  It is named after the Australian Blackwood tree species.

The parks is accessible via the Gregory Developmental Road.  Blackwood was created to protect Brigalow Belt plant communities and includes landscapes of rugged hills and gorges, stony ridges and alluvial flats.

About 80 species of birds have been recorded in the park.

Restrictions 
Camping and fires are not permitted within the park.

See also

 Protected areas of Queensland

References

National parks of Queensland
Protected areas established in 1991
North Queensland
1991 establishments in Australia